Max Settlage (born July 1, 1992) is an American former pair skater. With former partner Madeline Aaron, he is the 2014 CS U.S. Classic bronze medalist, a two-time U.S. national pewter medalist (2015–2016), and the 2014 U.S. national junior champion.

Personal life 
Max Settlage was born on July 1, 1992 in Thừa Thiên–Huế Province, Vietnam. After being adopted, he was raised in Flagstaff, Arizona. He is a cartoonist, who has done illustrations for U.S. Figure Skating.

Career 
Settlage began skating at age ten. His first pair skating partner was Caitlin Fields. In the 2007–08 season, they won the juvenile silver medal at the U.S. Junior Championships and the intermediate silver medal in the 2008-09 season.

Partnership with Aaron 
Settlage was paired with Madeline Aaron in May 2010 by coach Dalilah Sappenfield. The pair, both clockwise jumpers, moved from Arizona to Colorado for training.

Aaron/Settlage began competing on the ISU Junior Grand Prix series in 2011. They won two JGP medals — bronze in Lake Placid in 2012 and silver in Belarus in 2013. After winning the U.S. national junior title in January 2014, they were sent to the World Junior Championships and placed fifth.

Aaron/Settlage moved up to the senior level in the 2014–15 season. They were chosen to compete at the 2014 Skate Canada International after Zhang/Bartholomay's withdrawal. They were awarded the pewter medal for fourth place at the 2015 U.S. Championships.

After Settlage developed a lower back injury, in August 2015, the pair missed about three months of training. Aaron sustained a mild concussion in the summer when she fell on a mohawk turn. The pair decided to withdraw from their Grand Prix event, the 2015 Cup of China, and returned to competition at the 2015 CS Tallinn Trophy, where they placed fifth. At the 2016 U.S. Championships, they won the pewter medal for the second consecutive year.

Interviewed in late June 2016, Aaron/Settlage said that they planned to use a revised version of their 2015–16 short program and Scheherazade for their free skate. They were invited to the 2016 Skate America but withdrew from the event due to the end of their partnership. They made the announcement on August 10, 2016, with Settlage saying that he wanted to continue competing.

Later career 
Settlage teamed up with Winter Deardorff in late February 2017.

Programs
(with Aaron)

Competitive highlights
GP: Grand Prix; CS: Challenger Series; JGP: Junior Grand Prix

With Deardorff

With Aaron

With Fields

References

External links 
 
 Madeline Aaron / Max Settlage at IceNetwork.com

1992 births
American male pair skaters
Living people
American people of Vietnamese descent
People from Flagstaff, Arizona
People from Thừa Thiên-Huế province
American adoptees
21st-century American people